The following is a list of films produced in the Cinema of Portugal ordered by year of release in the 1980s. For an alphabetical list of Portuguese films see :Category:Portuguese films.

1980s

External links
 Portuguese film at the Internet Movie Database

1980s
Films
Portuguese

pt:Lista de filmes portugueses